In the My Little Pony franchise, the Earth ponies are ponies without a horn or wings. They were the first ponies to come out in 1983. They lack the ability to cast magic spells like unicorns or the ability to stand on clouds like the pegasi. Usually, they are the basic form of the My Little Pony toys.

References
General
 

Specific

Further reading
 Summer Hayes (May 1, 2008) The My Little Pony G1 Collector's Inventory: an unofficial full color illustrated collector's price guide to the first generation of MLP including all US ponies, playsets and accessories released before 1997 with a foreword by Dream Valley's Kim Shriner. Priced Nostalgia Press. 
 Summer Hayes (2007) The My Little Pony G3 Collector's Inventory: an unofficial full color illustrated guide to the third generation of MLP including all ponies, playsets and accessories from 2003 to the present. Priced Nostalgia Press. 
 Hillary DePiano (2005) The My Little Pony Collector's Inventory: A Complete Checklist of All US Ponies, Playsets and Accessories from 1981 to 1992. Priced Nostalgia Press. 
 Summer Hayes (2009) The My Little Pony 2007–2008 Collector's Inventory. Priced Nostalgia Press. 
 Debra L. Birge (2007) My Little Pony*r Around the World. Schiffer Publishing. 
 Wood, Walton. "The Empirical Twilight: A Pony's Guide to Science & Anarchism" ImageTexT: Interdisciplinary Comics Studies. 6.1 (2011): n. pag. Dept of English, University of Florida. 18 December 2011. Web.
 Brandon T. Snider. (2013) My Little Pony: The Elements of Harmony: Friendship is Magic: The Official Guidebook. Little, Brown Books. 

My Little Pony characters
My Little Pony Earth Ponies
My Little Pony Earth Ponies